Mike Filey (October 11, 1941 – July 30, 2022) was a Canadian historian, radio host, journalist and author. He was awarded the Jean Hibbert Memorial Award in 2009 for promoting the city of Toronto and its history.

Early life
Born in 1941 in Toronto, Filey attended high school at North Toronto Collegiate Institute and earned a degree in chemical technology from Ryerson Polytechnical Institute.

As a child, Filey lived with his family on Bathurst Street, just south of the iconic Honest Ed's.

Career
Filey began his career at what is now the Ontario Ministry of the Environment, working there for nine years. He then worked for five years at the Canadian National Exhibition and four years at Canada's Wonderland.

In 1972, Filey was an organizer of Heritage Toronto, a citizen's group interested in Toronto's history. From 1975 to 2020, he wrote the column, The Way We Were for the Toronto Sun.

Filey is the author of more than two dozen books about the history of Toronto. Among the topics covered are the Toronto Transit Commission (TTC), books with old photographs, and twelve books of Toronto Sketches. Over the years, Filey was a regular guest on several radio stations including CFRB, CKFM, and CHFI-FM and hosted his own weekly radio show, Mike Filey's Toronto, on Zoomer Radio 740. His guided walks included topics such as Toronto, Then and Now.

According to his friend Alan Parker, another columnist at the Toronto Sun, Filey has been called "Toronto's best-known historian".
For his love for Toronto, his extensive research, and his "consistent willingness to share his knowledge" in the history of Toronto, he was bestowed the Jean Hibbert Memorial Award by the Etobicoke Historical Society in 2009.

Personal life
Filey lived in Willowdale, Toronto, with his wife, Yarmila. Filey died on July 30, 2022, from prostate cancer.

Publications

References

Further reading

External links
Mike Filey's Toronto podcast

1941 births
2022 deaths
Writers from Toronto
Toronto Metropolitan University alumni
Canadian columnists
20th-century Canadian historians
21st-century Canadian historians
Canadian radio hosts
Toronto Sun people
Deaths from prostate cancer